Thomas L. Haskell was an American journalist from Maine. Haskell worked covering marine news for Portland, Maine's the Eastern Argus newspaper from 1857 to 1920. In that year, he joined the Portland Press. He continued with the newspaper when the Argus and Press merged to form the Portland Press Herald and continued working until 3 months prior to his death in 1928.

In 1924, the Portland local of the International Typographical Union called him the "dean of active American newspaper reporters." He served for 24 years as treasurer of the city's branch of the ITU.

He was survived by his wife, 4 sons, and a daughter.

References

1833 births
1928 deaths
Journalists from Maine
Writers from Portland, Maine
19th-century American journalists
International Typographical Union people